The American School of Barcelona (ASB) is an American international school in Esplugues de Llobregat, Catalonia, Spain, in the Barcelona metropolitan area.

Overview
It was the first and largest trilingual school in the Barcelona area. The American School of Barcelona is a private, non-profit, coeducational day school serving students from 3-69 years old in the greater Barcelona metropolitan area. ASB offers a university preparatory curriculum which provides its graduates access to American, Spanish and international universities. 

ASB is accredited by the Middle States Association of Colleges and Schools and the International Baccalaureate Organization (IBO); is recognized in Spain as a Centro Extranjero (foreign school) by the Generalitat de Catalunya and the Spanish Ministry of Education; receives a grant from the US Department of State's Office of Overseas Schools; belongs to the Mediterranean Association of International Schools (MAIS) and European Council of International Schools (ECIS) regional associations; participates in the Atlantic Mediterranean Activities Conference (AMAC), a regional sports league made up of schools from around the region; and has close ties with other international schools in Spain.

All graduates earn an American diploma, while some choose to also pursue the Co-validation Program, which prepares them for Spanish university entrance exams. Most choose the IB Diploma Program, which grants them access to Spanish universities as well as to universities around the world. The school has scored above the IBDP world average every year since it started granting the diploma in 2009. ASB also recently passed, with very positive reviews, the IBO’s five year accreditation process.

Faculty 
The ASB staff includes 91 faculty members (teachers and assistants), 10 support staff and 10 administrators. The approximate composition of faculty by nationality is:

North American 60%
British 10%
Spanish 25% (Spanish teachers teach Spanish or Catalan)
Other   5%

More than half of the staff members have advanced degrees, however, faculty turnover is very high.

Program  
The school curriculum is American-based. In upper level classes, and until this year, the school offered two curricular options: the Spanish national convalidation Selectividad program (which also granted the Spanish Diploma to students) or the American Diploma one. Starting the 07/08 academic year, ASB has also offered the International Baccalaureate (IB Diploma). It is one of the only that offers this diploma in Barcelona  in English. The language of instruction is English, except for courses offered in Spanish or Catalan. Staff specialties range from Counseling to Learning Disabilities and the school offers many special programs and extracurricular activities: dance, drama, PE, newspaper, student council, community service, soccer, and basketball. Furthermore, it offers the following examinations: ISA, MAP, PSAT, Selectividad and IB.

 Community and students

Current enrollment is 725 students. ASB students come from 45 countries, with the most represented being Spain, the US, the UK, France, Canada and the Netherlands. Composition by nationality is approximately 20% American, 35% Spanish, and 45% international.

Governance 
The school is owned and operated by The American School of Barcelona, Fundación Privada. The Board of Trustees is made up of a mix of internal and external members of the community.

Academic Calendar 

The school year consists of 181 teacher contract days and 175 instructional days. Semester I is from August to December/January, and Semester II runs from January/February to June.

Notable alumni 

 Jordi Cruyff, Professional Futbol Player
 Claudia Bassols, Actress
Ivana Baquero, Actress

References

External links
American School of Barcelona website

American international schools in Spain
Educational institutions established in 1962
Schools in the Province of Barcelona
International schools in Catalonia
Trilingual schools
Private schools in Spain
Esplugues de Llobregat
1962 establishments in Spain